Tartufo (meaning "truffle") is an Italian dessert of gelato (a type of ice cream) that originated in Pizzo, Calabria. The dessert takes the form of a ball that is composed of two or more flavors of gelato, often with melted chocolate inserted into the center (following the original recipe) or alternatively, with either fruit syrup or frozen fruit—typically raspberry, strawberry, or cherry—in the center. Typically, the desert is covered in a shell made of chocolate or cocoa, but sometimes cinnamon or nuts are used.

Tartufo di Pizzo has protected geographical indication in Italy, because Pizzo is the historical location where it was created as a "dessert of chocolate and hazelnut gelato balls filled with molten chocolate sauce and dusted in cocoa powder".

History
In 1946, master confectioner Dante Veronelli from Messina took over the Gran Bar Excelsior, that was first owned by Mr. Jannarelli, that was situated in the center of Pizzo. The name was soon changed into Bar Dante in honor of Veronelli.

Veronelli was helped by young Giuseppe De Maria (known as Don Pippo) who was also from Messina and whose contribution was crucial. Merging the entrepreneurial skills of the former and the productivity of the latter, the two were able to gain the attention of people thanks to the great quality and undisputed taste of their products.

After Veronelli's death, De Maria remained the only owner of the business.

The tartufo in its present shape was born in Pizzo at Bar Dante (around 1952) just by chance: following the marriage of two wealthy locals, Don Pippo discovered that he had run out of molds used to shape the gelato and couldn't supply the numerous guests. So he tried to solve the problem by putting small portions of hazelnut gelato and of chocolate gelato in the hollow of his hand, into which he added a bit of melted chocolate. He then wrapped everything in sugar paper, thereby creating the well-known shape of the tartufo that he then left to cool. The success of the preparation earned him immediate fame. The original recipe is still treasured by De Maria's relatives.

In 1950, Giorgio Di Iorgi and Gaetano Di Iorgi, who had started their career working in the gelato parlor as waiters, began to learn the art of making gelato. Fifteen years later, following the retirement of maestro De Maria, Giorgio took over the Bar Dante, while Gaetano continued making Tartufo di Pizzo in the Bar Ercole, which he acquired jointly with his brother Antonio in 1965.

To this day, the Bar Dante and Bar Ercole activities are managed by family, passing from father to son the secret recipe for making their gelato products.

Preparation
Tartufo is usually composed of two flavors of gelato that are sculpted together by hand. If there is fruit in the middle, the gelato may be scooped out from the middle and the fruit placed inside, or fruit syrup may be used to paste the two scoops together. If its shell is chocolate, special chocolate is usually melted and either dipped or poured over the gelato ball after being cooled to lukewarm—although it can also be rolled in the chocolate—and then frozen. If its shell is cinnamon or cocoa, it is usually rolled in cinnamon or cocoa before freezing. If nuts are used, they are usually put on by hand if large or, if smaller, rolled on. For a better shape, circular molds are sometimes used.

References 

Cuisine of Calabria
Frozen desserts
Ice cream
Italian desserts
Italian products with protected designation of origin